Timket (Ge'ez: ጥምቀት T’imk’et) is an Ethiopian Orthodox Tewahedo Church and Eritrean Orthodox Tewahedo Church celebration of Epiphany. It is celebrated on 19 January (or 20 in a leap year), corresponding to the 11th day of Terr in the Ge'ez calendar.

Timkat celebrates the baptism of Jesus in the River Jordan. This festival is best known for its ritual reenactment of baptism (similar to such reenactments performed by numerous Christian the Holy Land when they visit the Jordan).

During the ceremonies of Timkat, the Tabot, a model of the Ark of the Covenant, which is present on every Ethiopian altar (somewhat like the Western altar stone), is reverently wrapped in rich cloth and borne in procession on the head of the priest. The Tabot, which is otherwise rarely seen by the laity, represents the manifestation of Jesus as the Messiah when he came to the Jordan for baptism. The Divine Liturgy is celebrated near a stream or pool early in the morning (around 2 a.m.). Then the nearby body of water is blessed towards dawn and sprinkled on the participants, some of whom enter the water and immerse themselves, symbolically renewing their baptismal vows. But the festival does not end there; Donald N. Levine describes a typical celebration of the early 1960s:
 UNESCO inscribed Timkat in 2019 on the Representative List of the Intangible Cultural Heritage of Humanity.

Notes

External links

Timkat Celebration in Lalibela

Ethiopian Orthodox Tewahedo Church
January observances
Epiphany (holiday)
Christian festivals and holy days
Intangible Cultural Heritage of Humanity